Old Hungarian Fairy Tales was edited and translated from the Hungarian by Baroness Orczy (creator of the famous Scarlet Pimpernel series), in 1895.

The illustrations in the book were provided by her husband, Montagu Barstow, whom she married in 1894.

Stories include:
 Uletka and the White Lizard
 The Suitors of the Fire Fly
 The Twin Hunchbacks
 Mr Cuttlefish's Love Story
 Forget-me-not
 The Enchanted cat
 The Wishing Skin
 That's Not True

External links
 The Baldwin Project Read the stories

Collections of fairy tales
1895 books
Books by Baroness Orczy